Mario Blandón Artica is a retired Honduran football forward.

Club career
He played most of his senior career for Honduran giants F.C. Motagua in the Honduran league and was part of the famous team that remained unbeaten for 32 games in a row in 1973-1974. He is currently the sixth best scorer for Motagua of all times with 48 goals. He also played for Federal.

International career
Blandón has represented Honduras in 5 FIFA World Cup qualification matches in 1974.

Honours

Motagua
Liga Nacional de Fútbol de Honduras: 2
 1970–71, 1973–74

Individual
Top goalscorer in Liga Nacional de Honduras: 1
 1973–74

References

Year of birth missing (living people)
Living people
Association football forwards
Honduran footballers
Honduras international footballers
F.C. Motagua players
Liga Nacional de Fútbol Profesional de Honduras players